When Lights Are Low is a 1964 studio album by Tony Bennett.

Track listing
 "Nobody Else but Me" (Jerome Kern, Oscar Hammerstein II) – 2:56
 "When Lights Are Low" (Benny Carter, Spencer Williams) – 4:57
 "On Green Dolphin Street" (Bronisław Kaper, Ned Washington) – 4:02
 "Ain't Misbehavin" (Fats Waller, Harry Brooks, Andy Razaf) – 2:42
 "It's a Sin to Tell a Lie" (Billy Mayhew) – 2:18
 "I've Got Just About Everything" (Bob Dorough) – 6:08
 "Judy" (Sammy Lerner, Hoagy Carmichael) – 3:00
 "Oh! You Crazy Moon" (Johnny Burke, Jimmy Van Heusen) – 2:23
 "Speak Low" (Kurt Weill, Ogden Nash) – 2:08
 "It Had to Be You" (Isham Jones, Gus Kahn) – 3:15
 "It Could Happen to You" (Johnny Burke, Jimmy Van Heusen) – 1:18
 "The Rules of the Road" (Cy Coleman, Carolyn Leigh) – 2:13

Bonus tracks on CD reissue:
"How Long Has This Been Going On?" (George Gershwin, Ira Gershwin) – 2:43
"All of You" (Cole Porter) – 2:17
"We'll Be Together Again" (Carl T. Fischer, Frankie Laine) – 2:44

Personnel

Performance
 Tony Bennett – vocals
 Ralph Sharon – piano, arranger
 Hal Gaylord – bass
 Billy Exiner – drums

References

1964 albums
Albums arranged by Ralph Sharon
Columbia Records albums
Tony Bennett albums